Geranium caespitosum, the purple cluster geranium or pineywoods geranium, is a perennial herb native to the western United States and northern Mexico. Its US distribution includes Arizona, Colorado, Nevada, New Mexico, Texas, Utah, and Wyoming.

It has a purple to red flower with 5 stamens, and the sepals are acuminate, tapering with a long point. It has palmately lobed leaves. The fruit is a schizocarp made up of 5 mericarps. Flowers bloom May to September. It grows in damp soils, as in the understory of coniferous forests and in canyons.

Uses
The Gosiute use the plant as an astringent and a decoction of the root to treat diarrhea. The Keres use roots crushed into a paste to treat sores, and the whole plant as turkey food.

Varieties
The four varieties may known by the following common names:
G. c. var. caespitosum – pineywoods geranium
G. c. var. eremophilum – purple cluster geranium
G. c. var. fremontii – Fremont's geranium
G. c. var. parryi – Parry's geranium

In the United States, all four varieties are found in Arizona and New Mexico, and the purple cluster geranium is only found there. The other varieties are all found in Colorado, Utah, and Wyoming, and the pineywoods variety extends into Nevada and Texas.

Image gallery

References

caespitosum
Plants described in 1823
Flora of Arizona
Flora of Colorado
Flora of New Mexico
Flora of Nevada
Flora of Texas
Flora of Utah
Flora of Wyoming
Flora of Mexico
Flora of the United States
Flora without expected TNC conservation status